Neela Sandh is a waterfall in Mouri Syedan, Rawalpindi District of Punjab the province of Pakistan. It is surrounded by greenery, tall trees and extensive lush green mountains. It is a small waterfall which has a clear, bluish water stream.

See also 
List of waterfalls of Pakistan

References 

Waterfalls of Pakistan
Tourist attractions in Rawalpindi